is a Japanese voice actor most notable for providing the voice for Chang Wufei in Gundam Wing and Chousokabe Motochika in Sengoku Basara.

Voice roles

Anime
.hack//Roots (TV) as Smile (ep 23)
Ahiru no Quack (TV)
Ai to Yuuki no Pig Girl Tonde Buurin (TV) as Male Student
All Purpose Cultural Cat Girl Nuku Nuku (OAV) as student A (phase I)
Amatsuki (Susutake)
Ashita he Free Kick (TV) as announcer (ep 4); Carl Henderson; *Megalo (ep 9)
Dragon Knight (OAV) as Lizard B
Fuma no Kojirou: Fuma Hanran-hen (OAV) as Fûma A
Gintama (TV) as Brother-in-law (Ep. 39)
Golden Boy (OAV) as Animator
Gundam Wing Endless Waltz Special Edition (movie) as Chang Wu-Fei
GUNxSWORD (TV) as Zapiero Muttaaca
Hyper Police (TV) as Tommy Fujioka
Kikou Sennyo Rouran (TV) as Jimushi
Kuma no Puutarou (TV) as Narration
Kyouryuu Boukenki Jura Tripper (TV) as God
Manmaru the Ninja Penguin (TV) as Ratsubi (ep14)
MegaMan Maverick Hunter X: The Day of Sigma (OAV) as Penguin
Midnight Horror School (TV) as Genie
Mobile Suit Gundam Wing (TV) as Chang Wufei
Mobile Suit Gundam Wing: Endless Waltz (OAV) as Chang Wu-Fei
Mobile Suit Gundam Wing: Operation Meteor (OAV) as Chang Wufei
Mobile Suit Victory Gundam (TV) as Gettle Deple
Ningyo Hime Marina no Bouken (TV) as Chanshi
Parappa the Rapper (TV) as King of Neighbouring Country (Ep. 5)
Ranma 1/2 (TV) as Ukyo's Father / Mr. Kuonji
Saban's Adventures of the Little Mermaid as Chauncey
Sengoku Basara as Chousokabe Motochika
Sengoku Basara Two as Chousokabe Motochika
Space Oz no Bouken (TV) as Hunter; Radio Voice
Tanoshii Moomin Ikka (TV)
Tanoshii Moomin ikka: Moomin Tani no Suisei (movie) as Skrat
The Legend of Black Heaven (TV) as Suzuki (Raphael)
The Twelve Kingdoms (TV) as Yuuzen
Wedding Peach (TV) as Shinichi Kaji
Ys II (OAV) as Townsperson B; Young Warrior
Zoids/ZERO (TV) as McNair
Zoids: Fuzors (TV) as Burton

Tokusatsu
Juken Sentai Gekiranger (Confrontation Beast Toad-Fist Eruka (ep 19))
Kamen Rider Kiva (Rat Fangire (ep 36 - 37))
Samurai Sentai Shinkenger (Ayakashi Hitomidama (ep 9))
Tensou Sentai Goseiger (Teckric Alien Mazuāta of Music (ep 4))
Zyuden Sentai Kyoryuger (Debo Peshango (ep 2, 36))
Shuriken Sentai Ninninger (Youkai Kasha (ep 3))
Ultraman R/B (Alien Chibu (ep 18))

Drama CDs
Abunai series 4: Abunai Campus Love
Daisuki (Suzuki)

Games
Chousokabe Motochika in Sengoku Basara 2
Kurtz in Tales of Graces
Sasuke in Ehrgeiz
Chang Wufei in Another Century's Episode 2
Luzzu in Final Fantasy X
Tiziano and Cioccolata in GioGio's Bizarre Adventure
Icy Penguigo in Mega Man: Maverick Hunter X

Dub

Live-action
She-Wolf of London, Man 2

Animation
Furball in Tiny Toon Adventures
Bendy in Foster's Home for Imaginary Friends
Abyo in Pucca
Salty and Den in Thomas & Friends (Succeeded Salty from Naoki Tatsuta)

References

External links
 
 
 81 Produce profile
 Official Site
 Official Blog
 

81 Produce voice actors
Japanese male video game actors
Japanese male voice actors
Living people
Male voice actors from Tokyo
20th-century Japanese male actors
21st-century Japanese male actors
1962 births